Joseph Séguy (1689 in Rodez – 25 March 1761) was a French clergyman.

A royal preacher, he wrote Panégyriques de saints, Sermons pour les principaux jours du carême, and a Nouvel essai de poésies sacrées, in which he made a French verse translation of Psalms and the songs of the Bible. He was elected to the Académie française in 1736.

External links
Académie française

1689 births
1761 deaths
People from Rodez
Translators from Hebrew
18th-century French writers
18th-century French male writers
Translators to French
Members of the Académie Française
18th-century French translators